Eduardo Torres may refer to:

 Eduardo Torres (politician), Argentine politician
 Eduardo Torres (organist) (1872–1934), Spanish organist and composer